Jerranat Nakaviroj (born January 28, 1990) is a Thai taekwondo practitioner who was the bronze medalist at the 2013 World Taekwondo Championships in the men's finweight (under 54 kg) class.

References 

1990 births
Living people
Jerranat Nakaviroj
Universiade medalists in taekwondo
Jerranat Nakaviroj
Jerranat Nakaviroj
Southeast Asian Games medalists in taekwondo
Competitors at the 2009 Southeast Asian Games
Universiade gold medalists for Thailand
Asian Taekwondo Championships medalists
Medalists at the 2011 Summer Universiade
Jerranat Nakaviroj
Jerranat Nakaviroj